Kalyanavarman ruled Kamarupa from the Varman dynasty for the period of 422–446 A.D. He was the son of Kamrupi king Balavarman and queen Ratnavati. He married Gandharvavati and had a successor to throne named Ganapativarman.

Reign
Some scholars opine that during the tenure of Kalayanavarman, the kingdom of Davaka in central Assam was absorbed by Kamarupa.

See also
 Pushyavarman
 Samudravarman

References

Further reading
  
 
 
 
 
 
 
 
 
 
 
 
 

Varman dynasty
5th-century Indian monarchs